The 1982 Missouri Tigers football team was an American football team that represented the University of Missouri in the Big Eight Conference (Big 8) during the 1982 NCAA Division I-A football season. The team compiled a 5–4–2 record (2–3–2 against Big 8 opponents), finished in fifth place in the Big 8, and outscored its opponents by a combined total of 207 to 196. Warren Powers was the head coach for the fifth of seven seasons. The team played its home games at Faurot Field in Columbia, Missouri.

The team's statistical leaders included Tracey Mack with 484 rushing yards, Marlon Adler with 1,242 passing yards, and James Caver with 634 receiving yards.

Schedule

References

Missouri
Missouri Tigers football seasons
Missouri Tigers football